Sotirios Stathakis (born 15 April 1953) is a Greek former water polo player who competed in the 1980 Summer Olympics and in the 1984 Summer Olympics.

See also
 Greece men's Olympic water polo team records and statistics
 List of men's Olympic water polo tournament top goalscorers

References

External links
 

1953 births
Living people
Greek male water polo players
Olympic water polo players of Greece
Water polo players at the 1980 Summer Olympics
Water polo players at the 1984 Summer Olympics

Ethnikos Piraeus Water Polo Club players